The  is a member of the Cabinet of Japan and is the leader and chief executive of the Ministry of Health, Labour, and Welfare. The minister is nominated by the Prime Minister of Japan and is appointed by the Emperor of Japan.

Minister Katsunobu Katō took office on 10 August 2022.

List of Ministers of Health, Labour, and Welfare (2001–)

References

External links
Official website

Health ministers of Japan
Labor ministers of Japan
Ministers of Health and Welfare of Japan
 
Japan|*